Aku Stacy may refer to:

 Aku Stacy (album), the debut album of the sixth winner of Akademi Fantasia, Stacy
"Aku Stacy" (song) the first single off the album